Samuela is a given name. Notable people with the name include:
Samuela Anise (born 1986), a Japanese rugby union footballer
Samuela Bola (born 1983), a Fijian rugby union footballer
Samuela Davetawalu, a Fijian rugby league footballer
Samuela Drudru (born 1989), a Fijian association (soccer) footballer
Samuela Leuii (born 1972), a Samoan boxer
Samuela Kautoga (born 1987), a Fijian association (soccer) footballer
Samuela Marayawa, a Fijian rugby league footballer
Samuela Matakibau, a Fijian former police officer
Samuela Nabenia (born 1995), a Fijian association (soccer) footballer
Samuela Tupou (born 1955), a Fijian swimmer
Samuela Tuikiligana (born 1958), a Fijian international lawn bowler
Samuela Valelala, a Fijian rugby league footballer
Samuela Vula (born 1984), a Fijian association (soccer) footballer
Samuela Vunisa (born 1988), an Italian rugby union footballer
Samuela Vunivalu (born circa 1957), a Fijian politician
Samuela Yavala (born 1947), a Fijian sprinter

See also
Samuel (name)
Samiuela